The Telegraph Fire is a wildfire that started near Superior, Arizona on June 4, 2021. The fire burned  and was fully contained on July 3, 2021. It was the largest wildfire in the United States of the 2021 wildfire season until being surpassed by the Bootleg Fire in Oregon on July 13, 2021.

Events

June 
The Telegraph Fire was first reported at around 1:30 pm MST on June 4, 2021.

Cause 
The fire is believed to be human-caused, but it is still under further investigation.

Containment 
On July 3, 2021, the Telegraph Fire reached 100% containment.

Aftermath

Impact

Closures and Evacuations 
The Telegraph Fire has led to a number of closures and evacuations.

On June 6, 2021, residents in Top-of-the-World and the Oaks Mobile Home and RV Park were ordered to evacuate. Later that same day, all Miami residents west of the Miami town limits were ordered to evacuate. On June 14, 2021, residents of El Capitan, Arizona were ordered to evacuate.

State Route 77 is closed in both directions between the State Route 177 junction in Winkelman and US 70. State Route 177 is closed between US 60 in Superior and State Route 77 in Winkelman.

Damage 
As of June 19, 2021, 51 structures have been destroyed by the fire, including 22 buildings in El Capitan.

See also 
 2021 Arizona wildfires
 List of Arizona wildfires
Mescal Fire, another large wildfire burning near the Telegraph Fire

References 

Wildfires in Arizona
2021 Arizona wildfires
June 2021 events in the United States